Technician 5th Grade Alfred Leonard Wilson (September 18, 1919November 8, 1944) was a United States Army soldier who received the Medal of Honor for his heroic actions during World War II.

Biography
Alfred Leonard Wilson joined the United States Army in March 1943 and by November 8, 1944, was serving as a Technician 5th Grade with the Medical Detachment of the 328th Infantry, 26th Infantry Division. During a firefight on that day, near Bezange-la-Petite, France, Wilson was severely wounded but refused evacuation and continued to treat other injured soldiers until he fell unconscious. He died of his wounds and was posthumously awarded the Medal of Honor seven months later, on June 18, 1945. Aged 25 at his death, Wilson was buried at Maple Grove Cemetery in Fairchance, Pennsylvania.

Medal of Honor citation

Legacy
Wilson Barracks, also known as Landstuhl Regional Medical Center, in Landstuhl, Germany, is named in honor of him.

See also 
List of Medal of Honor recipients
List of Medal of Honor recipients for World War II
List of people from Pennsylvania

Notes

References

External links

 
 

1919 births
1944 deaths
American coal miners
Burials in Pennsylvania
Civilian Conservation Corps people
Combat medics
Deaths by firearm in France
Military personnel from Pennsylvania
People from Fayette County, Pennsylvania
United States Army Medal of Honor recipients
United States Army non-commissioned officers
United States Army personnel killed in World War II
World War II recipients of the Medal of Honor